The 1986 All-Ireland Under-21 Football Championship was the 23rd staging of the All-Ireland Under-21 Football Championship since its establishment by the Gaelic Athletic Association in 1964.

Cork entered the championship as defending champions.

On 14 September 1986, Cork won the championship following a 3-16 to 0-12 defeat of Offaly in the All-Ireland final. This was their seventh All-Ireland title overall and their third in successive seasons.

Results

All-Ireland Under-21 Football Championship

Semi-finals

Finals

Statistics

Miscellaneous

 Cork become the second team after Kerry in 1977 to win three successive All-Ireland titles.

References

1986
All-Ireland Under-21 Football Championship